Diego Calvanese is an Italian Computer Scientist and Professor at the Faculty of Computer Science at the Free University of Bozen-Bolzano. In addition, since 2019, he is Wallenberg visiting Professor at the Department of Computing Science, Umeå University.
He is well known for his scientific contributions in knowledge representation and reasoning in AI, description logics, and database theory.

Education 
Calvanese graduated in electronic engineering (110/110 cum laude) at Sapienza University, Rome, where he also completed his Ph.D. in Computer Science.

Awards (selection) 
 Fellow of the European Association for Artificial Intelligence (2015)
 Fellow of the Association for Computing Machinery (2019)

Entrepreneurial Activities 
Diego Calvanese is the initiator and co-founder of Ontopic, a spin-off of the Free University of Bozen-Bolzano.

References

External links 
 Ontopic (ontopic.ai)
 Google Scholar

1966 births
Living people
Sapienza University of Rome alumni
Academic staff of Umeå University
Academic staff of the Free University of Bozen-Bolzano